Alfred Ntombela (born 3 April 1972) is a South African actor, known for his role in South African candid genre films alongside Leon Schuster, his fast-paced Joker-like laugh and for his small stature as an adult.

He became renowned for his roles in Sweet 'n Short and Mama Jack. His native language is Zulu but he also speaks English and Afrikaans.

He announced his retirement from acting in 2018 after 28 years in the industry.

Filmography

References

External links

1972 births
Living people
Zulu people
South African male film actors